San Cayetano Istepeque, is a municipality in the San Vicente department of El Salvador. Its altitude is approximately 510 m.

Municipalities of the San Vicente Department